Rouse Hill Town Centre (commonly referred to as RHTC) is a shopping centre in the suburb of Rouse Hill in the Hills District of Sydney, New South Wales. The centre is part of a larger development proposal for the Rouse Hill Regional Centre.

Unlike many shopping centres in Australia, Rouse Hill Town Centre is a true town centre with streets, a Town Square, outdoor dining and a mix of indoor and outdoor spaces. The centre features high ceilings and has no doors between indoor and outdoor sections. The centre is divided into four quadrants. Each quadrant has its own distinct range of stores, and all four quadrants meet at an area known as the Town Square. From the Town Square, the Main Street and Civic Way branch out to separate the four quadrants. Its main competitors are Castle Towers and Westpoint Blacktown both about 10 km away.

The centre comprises a number of major retailers, as well as cafes, fine dining and entertainment venues.

Staging
The first stage including a Coles and Woolworths supermarket, along with 80 speciality stores, a food terrace, and fruit and vegetable market opened on 25 September 2007.

The second stage opened on 6 March 2008, which included the opening of major shops such as Target, Big W, Reading Cinemas along with more speciality stores. A library and community centre, commercial office space and a special learning precinct have also been created. In February 2021 Target left the centre and was replaced by Kmart.

References

External links
Rouse Hill Town Centre website
New Rouse Hill website

Shopping centres in Sydney
Shopping malls established in 2008
2008 establishments in Australia
The Hills Shire
Rouse Hill, New South Wales